The Chiltern Tunnel is a high-speed railway tunnel currently under construction in Buckinghamshire and Hertfordshire, England, and will upon completion carry the High Speed 2 (HS2) railway line under the Chiltern Hills.

A contract for the tunnel's construction was awarded in 2017; preparatory work commenced during the following year. In May 2021, it was announced that excavation had commenced.

History
The construction of the High Speed 2 (HS2) railway is to involve numerous major civil engineering works along its intended route. Construction periodical New Civil Engineer has described the Chiltern Hills as "HS2’s biggest and potentially most challenging site".

The design of the Chiltern tunnel has been subject to changes during the planning stages of the project. During 2017, Contract C1 (Central 1), which covers the 21.6km section of the line that the Chiltern tunnels comes within, was awarded to the Align JV joint venture, comprising Bouygues Travaux Publics, Sir Robert McAlpine and VolkerFitzpatrick. The two tunnel boring machines were supplied by Herrenknecht and were delivered to the site in December 2020.

Design
The basic configuration of the Chiltern tunnel will consist of a pair of parallel bores, which are to be excavated by a pair of tunnel boring machines (TBMs). Staff are conveyed between the surface and the TBM using people carriers, which will have up to a one-hour transit time towards the later years of the boring. While both TBMs are intended to be operational simultaneously throughout the majority of the work, due to sensitivities surrounding the M25 motorway, only one TBM will be active at a time while within close proximity to this key trunk route.

The southern entrance to the tunnels is aligned with the nearby Colne Valley Viaduct and is near the M25. The completed tunnel will have a total of forty cross passages linking the two separate bores and five shafts which will be used for both ventilation and emergency access purposes; these are located (in order from South to North) at Chalfont St Peter, Chalfont St Giles, Amersham, Little Missenden and Chesham Road - the latter of which is just an intervention shaft for emergencies. These vents are all to be fitted with headhouses, produced through engagement with both the Chilterns AONB Review Group and Buckinghamshire Council. The surface elements of the St Giles shaft have been intentionally disguised as agricultural buildings. The initial design of the Amersham vent shaft was criticised due to its design being so out of keeping with its location. After several iterations the design is at its final approval stage.

Construction
To accommodate workers during the construction phase, a temporary facility containing accommodation and various amenities has been constructed on site; this site will also be used to support the construction of the nearby Colne Valley Viaduct as well.

During September 2020, final preparations for the arrival of the first of the two TBMs were made, and both arrived on site in December that year. During March 2021, the first section of fibre-reinforced concrete tunnel lining was cast; this is produced onsite at a purpose-built facility near to the southern portal, which is capable of manufacturing up to 49 sections at a time. A total of 56,000 precisely-engineered sections will be required to complete each tunnel.

Excavation commenced on 13 May 2021, with completion estimated around March 2024. Each TBM is operated by a crew of 17 working in 12-hour shifts, while surface logistics and support for the boring work is provided by over 100 people on the surface. During June 2021, the second TBM commenced boring as well.

The first stage of the drive (from the south portal to the Chalfont St Peter ventilation shaft) was completed in March 2022, and the first of the cross passages between the main running tunnels were completed in August that year. The Chalfont St Giles ventilation shaft was reached in October 2022.

Approval for this scheme was issued in May 2021.

Progress
Both TBMs are currently located roughly 2km south of the Buckinghamshire town of Amersham and are roughly 1.3km away from the ventilation shaft of the same name.

References

External links 
 HS2 - Chiltern Tunnel

High Speed 2
Tunnels in Buckinghamshire
Railway tunnels in the United Kingdom